Sir Edward Thornton  (13 July 1817 – 26 January 1906) was a British diplomat who held posts in Latin America, Turkey, Russia, and served for fourteen years as Minister to the United States.

Early career

Thornton was born in London, the son of Sir Edward Thornton, 1st Count of Cacilhas, also a diplomat, who for many years held the post of British Minister to Portugal.

On his father's death, Thornton became 2nd Count of Cacilhas (also "Cassilhas").

Thornton was educated at King's College London, and at Pembroke College, Cambridge. He entered the diplomatic service as attaché to the mission at Turin in 1842, filled the same position in Mexico in 1845, and was made Secretary of Legation in that Capital in 1853. Thornton did much to forward the conclusion of the Treaty of Guadalupe Hidalgo in 1848. In 1852, he was appointed Secretary of Legation at Buenos Aires, and chargé d'affaires to Uruguay in 1854. He was appointed Minister to the Argentine Republic in 1859, and to the Empire of Brazil in 1865.

Paraguay
In November 1859, Thornton ordered the Royal Navy to attack the Paraguyan war steamer Tacuari, which future president Francisco Solano López was on, to pressure his father president Carlos López to release a British citizen from prison. This was one of several incidents that damaged Paraguayan relations with Britain. Thornton would later apologise for the action to repair relations, and promised Britain had no intention of interfering with Paraguayan jurisdiction. His actions were used in a House of Commons debate on a potential war with Brazil, with William "Seymour" Vesey-FitzGerald calling him "a gentleman who knows how to conciliate... that it is not his duty to 'read lessons' to foreign Governments" as an attack on Brazilian consul William Dougal Christie, while opposing MP Layard pointed to Thornton as proof that Britain did not take a "high hand" with Latin American nations. At the time, there was a belief that Latin American states were constantly embroiled in tensions and would cause strife for foreign governments.

After the war scare with Brazil was averted, another major geopolitical conflict embroiled South America – the Paraguayan War. Brazil, Argentina and Uruguay signed the Treaty of the Triple Alliance, which united all three nations against Paraguay. According to American historian Pelham H. Box, Argentine foreign minister Rufino de Elizalde informed Thornton the Argentine government had no wish to annex Paraguay, but hoped that in the long term Paraguay might voluntarily join the Argentine Confederation (as was contemplated by Article 13 of the Argentine Constitution). He also informed Thornton that the Argentine Congress feared the provisions in the Treaty might prevent such an occurrence. After the war concluded, Thornton was withdrawn from his position, having concluded several agreements during his tenure.

Minister to the United States

Thornton's lengthiest assignment was as Minister to the United States, a position he held for fourteen years (1867–1881).

In 1871, Thornton served as a member of the commission on the Alabama Claims, and was appointed Privy Councilor. Thornton served in 1873 as an arbitrator in the commission on the Mexican and United States Claims. He was appointed Ambassador at St. Petersburg in 1881. For his services Thornton was invested Knight Grand Cross of the Order of the Bath in 1883. A year later Thornton received his last appointment, Ambassador at Constantinople, a position he held for three years before retiring.

Thornton died at his London residence, 5 Tedworth Sq., after what was described as a lengthy illness. He is buried in Brookwood Cemetery. As his son and heir, diplomat Edward Thornton (born 1856), had died in 1904, the title of Count of Cacilhas passed to his grandson, Edward Thornton.

References

External links

 Sir Edward Thornton Correspondence with the British Foreign Office. General Collection, Beinecke Rare Book and Manuscript Library, Yale University.

1817 births
1906 deaths
Alumni of King's College London
Alumni of Pembroke College, Cambridge
Knights Grand Cross of the Order of the Bath
Members of the Privy Council of the United Kingdom
Ambassadors of the United Kingdom to Russia
Ambassadors of the United Kingdom to Brazil
Ambassadors of the United Kingdom to the Ottoman Empire
Ambassadors of the United Kingdom to the United States
Ambassadors of the United Kingdom to Argentina
Ambassadors of the United Kingdom to Uruguay
Burials at Brookwood Cemetery